Michelle Muscatello (born May 18, 1978 or 1979 in Butler, Pennsylvania) is an American weather reporter, who joined WPRI-TV in September 2004. She appears each weekday morning for Eyewitness News This Morning and at noon on Eyewitness News at noon.

Before joining Channel 12, Muscatello worked as a weekend weathercaster/reporter in Charleston, South Carolina, for WCIV-TV. Muscatello covered Hurricane Gaston’s direct hit to the area, along with the tornadoes, severe thunderstorms and flooding spawned by Hurricanes Charley and Frances.

Muscatello is currently enrolled in Mississippi State University’s Broadcast Meteorology Program, where she is receiving a certification in meteorology. She also has a B.A. in journalism and mass communication from the University of North Carolina at Chapel Hill. While in college, Muscatello interned for WCIV-TV in Charleston, South Carolina, and ABC News' 20/20.

References

American television personalities
American women television personalities
Living people
1970s births
People from Butler, Pennsylvania